Vasalunds IF is a Swedish football club based in Solna, Stockholm. The club is affiliated with Stockholms Fotbollförbund.

History
Vasalund was formed in 1934 and play in the Swedish Third Division: Division 1 Norra. In 2002 the club merged with Essinge IK and changed its name to Vasalund/Essinge IF. The merger was discontinued and the original name was restored before the 2008 season. Vasalund are in close collaboration with Allsvenskan side AIK.

Season to season

Cup (Svenska Cupen)

Attendances

In recent seasons Vasalunds IF have had the following average attendances:

Squad

Coaches
 Bo Petersson (1983–84)
 Bo Petersson (1988–90)
 Erik Hamrén (1992–93)
 Kjell Jonevret (1993–94)
 Roger Palmgren (2003–2004)
 Bo Petersson (2004–05)
 Peter Lenell (2008–2009)
 Azrudin Valentic (2009–2011)
 Babar Rehman (2013–2015)
 Roberth Björknesjö (2015)
 Pascal Simpson (2016)
 Kalle Karlsson (2017)
 Carlos Banda (2017)
 Babar Rehman (2017)
  Nebojša Novaković (2018–2019)
 Dalibor Savic (2019–2021)
 Roberth Björknesjö (2021)
 Diamantis "Akis" Vavalis (2022)
 Babar Rehman (2022)
 Dimitrios Giantsis (2023–)

Achievements

League

 Division 1 Norra:
 Runners-up (4): 1989, 1990, 1993, 2008, 2016
 Division 1 Östra:
 Runners-up (2): 1991, 1992
 Division 2 Östra Svealand:
 Runners-up (3): 1999, 2004, 2005
 Division 2 Norra Svealand:
 Winners (1): 2018
 Division 3 Norra Svealand:
 Winners (1): 2002

External links
Vasalunds IF

Footnotes

 
Association football clubs established in 1934
Football clubs in Stockholm
1934 establishments in Sweden